The final of the Men's Shot Put event at the 2003 Pan American Games took place on Tuesday August 5, 2003. USA's Reese Hoffa set a new Pan American Games record in the final, with a distance of 20.95 metres.

Medalists

Records

Results

See also
 2003 Shot Put Year Ranking
2003 World Championships in Athletics – Men's shot put
Athletics at the 2004 Summer Olympics – Men's shot put

References
Results

Shot Put, Men
2003